Gayatri Rajapatni (1276—1350) was the queen consort of Majapahit's founder and first king Kertarajasa Jayawardhana, and also the mother of Tribhuwana Wijayatunggadewi, the queen regnal of Majapahit. A devout Buddhist, she was the youngest daughter of Kertanegara, king of Singhasari.

She was an influential figure within Majapahit inner palace and later in her life acted as the matriarch of Majapahit's Rajasa Dynasty. Tradition mentioned her as a woman of extraordinary beauty with exceptional charm, wisdom and intelligence.

Early life
Gayatri was raised as a princess in Tumapel palace, Kutaraja, the capital of Singhasari kingdom, East Java. Her name derived from Gayatri, the Hindu goddess personification of hymn and mantras. She was the youngest daughter of King Kertanegara. Her siblings are Tribhuwaneswari the oldest, Prajnaparamitha, and Narendra Duhita. Kertanegara did not have any son as his heir, instead he has four daughters, dubbed as the four Princesses of Singhasari. King Kertanegara was well known as a pious adherent of Tantric Buddhism, it is highly possible that Gayatri also exposed to Buddhism ideas and subsequently adhered the religion. Gayatri's eldest sibling, Tribhuwaneswari was betrothed to Prince Nararya Sangramawijaya (Raden Wijaya), still a relative of Kertanegara's extended family, and probably groomed to be his successor. According to tradition, Gayatri was mentioned as a keen and bright student in literature, social, political and religious matters.

In 1292 Gayatri witnessed the destruction of her home, the Singhasari kingdom, under the unsuspected attack of Jayakatwang, Duke of Gelang-gelang (Kediri). Yet she survived and escaped unharmed from the burning palace, immediately discarding her identity, hiding and blending herself among the captured servants and slaves. His eldest sister, Tribhuwana, managed to escape and reunited with her husband, Raden Wijaya, while her other sisters, Prajnaparamitha, and Narendra Duhita, were captured by enemy forces and held hostage in Kediri. For about a year she hid herself in Kediri palace posing as a servant.

George Coedes contends Raden Vijaya and Gayatri Rajapatni were married before the Jayakatwang revolt, during which she was killed.

Raden Wijaya in 1293 cunningly using the aid of invading Mongol forces manage to destroy Jayakatwang forces in Kediri, and finally liberated Gayatri and rescued her captured sisters. Prince Nararya Sangrama Wijaya ascended to the throne in regnal name as King Kertarajasa Jayawardhana in November 1293, and established Majapahit kingdom. He took Gayatri as his wife, also Gayatri's sisters; Prajnaparamitha, and Narendra Duhita, concluding all of Kertanegara's daughters as his consorts. This action was probably motivated to strengthen his claim to the throne as the sole successor of Kertanegara by removing possible contests of the princesses suitors. Another opinion suggested that his marriage to Prajnaparamita and Narendra Duhita was just a formality, an act of compassion to save the family's reputation, since it is probably during their captivity in Kediri, the two princesses suffered severe abuses and harassment that physically and psychologically scarred them beyond marriage.

Life as queen consort
Gayatri was one of King Kertarajasa's five wives. Other than Gayatri's three sisters, the Kertanegara's daughters princesses of Singhasari, Kertarajasa also took Dara Petak, the princess of Malayu Dharmasraya kingdom as his wife and named her Indreswari. Among these queens, only she and Indreswari bore Kertarajasa's children, while Tribhuwaneswari, Kertarajasa's first wife and other wives seems to be barren. Indreswari bore Kertarajasa a son and thus an heir, Jayanegara, while Gayatri bore him two daughters, princess Gitarja and Rajadewi. 

Tradition mentioned that Gayatri is Kertarajasa's favourite, thus earned her a new name "Rajapatni" or "Raja's (king's) consort or companion", praised the couple as a perfect match, as far as comparing the couple as the incarnation of celestial couple; Shiva and Parvati. She seems to take interest in Adityawarman, Jayanegara's cousin of Malayu Dharmasraya lineage. She carefully see through Adityawarman's education and career development, and became his sponsor and patron.

Life as queen dowager
After the death of her husband, King Kertarajasa in 1309, her step son, Jayanegara, rose to become the next monarch. During the reign of Jayanegara, Gayatri seems to take the role as dowager queen, as an influential matriarch figure of Majapahit inner circle within the palace. During this years she oversaw the rise of capable Gajah Mada's career, and probably become his sponsor, patron and protector, recruiting Gajah Mada into her daughter, Tribhuwana Wijayatunggadewi's side as a trusted officer.

Later life
At a certain point of time during the last years of Jayanegara's reign, Gayatri renounced her worldly affairs and retired as a Bhikkuni (Buddhist nun). After the death of Jayanegara in 1328, she was then the sole surviving elder of Majapahit royal family since her sisters and Indreswari all already died. Responsible for the succession of Majapahit throne, Gayatri appointed her daughter Tribhuwana Wijayatunggadewi to rule the kingdom on her behalf in 1329.

In 1350, Gayatri Rajapatni died in her vihara (monastery), subsequently Queen regnant Tribhuwana Wijayatunggadewi abdicated her throne in favor to her son Hayam Wuruk that ascended the throne in the same year. Her death marked the ascend of Hayam Wuruk to the throne since Tribhuwana Tunggadewi was only become queen regnant on behalf of Gayatri.

The Nagarakretagama written in 1365 by Prapanca during the reign of Hayam Wuruk, Gayatri's grandson, describe the elaborate and solemn Sraddha ceremony dedicated for the departed spirit of revered Gayatri Rajapatni. She was enshrined in several temples and posthumously portrayed as Prajnaparamita, the Mahayana Buddhist female Bodhisattva of transcendental wisdom. Some inscription mentions the lofty offering and ceremony performed by Adityawarman and Gajah Mada to honor the spirit of late Gayatri Rajapatni, suggested that both men owed their career to Gayatri Rajapatni's patronage.

References

 Drake, Earl. 2012. Gayatri Rajapatni, Perempuan di Balik Kejayaan Majapahit. Yogyakarta: Ombak
 Drake, Earl. 2015. Gayatri Rajapatni: The Woman Behind the Glory of Majapahit. Penang: Areca Books.
 Slamet Muljana. 2005. Menuju Puncak Kemegahan. Jakarta: LKIS
 Slamet Muljana. 1979. Nagarakretagama dan Tafsir sejarahnya. Jakarta: Bhratara

Indonesian Buddhist monarchs
Javanese people
Queens of Majapahit
1350 deaths
13th-century Indonesian women
14th-century Indonesian women
Indonesian Buddhist nuns
14th-century Buddhist nuns
Queen mothers